Gonionota oxybela is a moth in the family Depressariidae. It was described by John Frederick Gates Clarke in 1971. It is found in Peru.

The wingspan is 18–20 mm. The forewings are bister brown with tawny-olive irroration (sprinkles) and in the outer half of the wing considerable ochraceous-tawny scaling. The costa is ochraceous tawny mixed with tawny olive and from the basal third of the costa an ill-defined tawny-olive line extends to the fold where it continues outwardly to the tornus. The hindwings are sepia.

References

Moths described in 1971
Gonionota